Dietrich Flade (died 1589) was a German lawyer, judge and educator. He was one of the most known victims of the Trier witch trials.  He was active as a judge during the Trier witch trials until he himself was arrested and executed for sorcery.

References

1589 deaths
Witch trials in Germany
16th-century executions in the Holy Roman Empire
People executed by strangulation
People executed for witchcraft